Malberg may refer to several places in Rhineland-Palatinate, Germany:

Malberg, Altenkirchen
Malberg, Bitburg-Prüm
Malberg, a low mountain in the Westerwaldkreis

See also

 Mahlberg (disambiguation)